Martina Navratilova and Jana Novotná won the title by defeating Tracy Austin and Gigi Fernández in the final in two sets.

Draw

External links
Draw sheet
Final result

2014 US Open (tennis)